Area G was one of the eight district electoral areas (DEA) which existed in Belfast, Northern Ireland from 1973 to 1985. Covering Belfast city centre and the inner parts of the north and west of the city, the district elected six members to Belfast City Council and contained the wards of Central; Court; Crumlin; New Lodge; North Howard; and Shankill. The DEA formed part of the Belfast North and Belfast West constituencies.

History
The area was created for the 1973 local government elections. It combined the whole of the former Court and Dock wards with parts of the Clifton, Shankill, Smithfield and Woodvale wards. It was abolished for the 1985 local government elections, when it was split between the new Oldpark and Court DEAs.

Results

1973

1977

January 1981 by-election
The by-election was held in controversial circumstances following the death of the Alliance councillor McKeown. The DUP were criticised for blocking the co-option of an Alliance member, triggering an election just 3 months before regular council elections were held. The DUP then opted not to contest the by-election. The UUP candidate David Smylie, a former councillor for Area E, withdrew after nominations closed, claiming that he had received a paramilitary death threat. In March 1981, Sammy Millar, the by-election winner, survived an assassination attempt by the Irish National Liberation Army in which he was seriously injured.

1981

References

Former District Electoral Areas of Belfast
1973 establishments in Northern Ireland
1985 disestablishments in Northern Ireland